Edward William Watson (1859–1936) was Regius Professor of Ecclesiastical History at the University of Oxford.

Selected publications
Ashmore, Co. Dorset. A history of the parish. With index to the Registers 1651 to 1820
Church and state in England to the death of Queen Anne, Longmans, Green and Co., London, 1917. (With Henry Melvill Gwatkin)
Life of Bishop John Wordsworth, Longmans, Green and Co., London, 1915.
Cambridge senate-house problems and riders for the year 1860; with solutions, University of Cambridge, Cambridge, 1860.
The Church of England, Williams and Norgate, London, 1914. (Home University Library of Modern Knowledge)

References

External links 

http://discovery.nationalarchives.gov.uk/details/rd/N13854110

Academics of the University of Oxford
1859 births
1936 deaths